Zhang Ying is a Chinese swimmer. She won the silver medal at the Women's 100 metre backstroke S7 event at the 2016 Summer Paralympics with 1:23.34. She was fourth placed at the same event at the 2012 Summer Paralympics with an Asian record of 1:25.63.

References

Living people
Swimmers at the 2016 Summer Paralympics
Medalists at the 2016 Summer Paralympics
Paralympic silver medalists for China
Paralympic swimmers of China
Swimmers at the 2012 Summer Paralympics
S7-classified Paralympic swimmers
Chinese female backstroke swimmers
Year of birth missing (living people)
Paralympic medalists in swimming
21st-century Chinese women